Radhika Herzberger (née Jayakar; born 1938) is an Indian writer, educationist and scholar in Sanskrit and Indology.  She  lives in Rishi Valley School, in the Chittoor district of Andhra Pradesh, and serves as the Director of Rishi Valley Education Centre,  an educational institution founded by Jiddu Krishnamurti in the 1920s.

Biography
She was born as Radhika Jayakar in Uttar Pradesh, to Manohar Jayakar and Pupul Jayakar (née Mehta), cultural activist and biographer of Jiddu Krishnamurti and Indira Gandhi, in 1938. After obtaining a doctorate from the University of Toronto, she joined Rishi Valley Education Centre  as an instructor in history, eventually becoming the Director of the institution.

Publications
Radhika Herzberger has published a book, An Essay in the Development of Fifth and Sixth Century Indian Thought, as a part of Indian Classical Studies.

She has also published articles in journals such as the Indian Journal of Philosophy.

Awards
The Government of India honoured her, in 2013, by awarding her the Padma Shri, the fourth highest civilian award, for her contributions to the fields of literature and education.

See also
 Pupul Jayakar

References

External links
 
 
 

1938 births
Living people
Recipients of the Padma Shri in literature & education
20th-century Indian educational theorists
Indian women scholars
Scholars from Uttar Pradesh
20th-century Indian women scientists
Women writers from Uttar Pradesh
Women educators from Uttar Pradesh
Educators from Uttar Pradesh
20th-century women writers
20th-century women educators